Bootle Beetle is a 1947 animated short film featuring Donald Duck.  It was released by Walt Disney Productions.

Plot
A rare breed insect, the Bootle beetle, tells the story of how, as a child, he left the forest and came across a monster, Donald Duck, who recognized the rare insect and tried to capture him in a jar.

Voice cast
Clarence Nash as Donald Duck
Dink Trout as Bootle Beetle

Home media
The short was released on December 11, 2007 on Walt Disney Treasures: The Chronological Donald, Volume Three: 1947-1950.

References

External links
 
 

1947 films
1947 animated films
1940s Disney animated short films
Donald Duck short films
Films produced by Walt Disney
Films scored by Oliver Wallace